As One Aflame Laid Bare by Desire is the seventh studio album by the Darkwave band Black Tape for a Blue Girl. It was released in 1999 by Projekt Records. It owes some artistic inspiration to Marcel Duchamp.

Track listing
"As One Aflame Laid Bare by Desire" - 7:19
"Given" (1. the Waterfall 2. the Illuminating Gas) - 4:20
"Entr'acte [the Garden Awaits Us]" - 1:33
"Tell Me You've Taken Another" - 5:17
"Entr'acte [the Carnival Barker]" - 1:00
"Dream" - 1:53
"The Apotheosis" - 6:19
"Russia" - 6:41
"Your One Wish" - 1:29
"Dulcinea" - 6:14
"The Green Box" - 6:38
"Denouement / Denouncement" - 6:52
"The Passage" - 15:47

Band Personnel Shift
This album saw the return of vocalist Julianna Towns (of the band Skinner Box, who first appeared on A Chaos of Desire), replacing vocalist Lucan. Julianna left the band again after a pre-release promotional tour. This was the last album to feature original male vocalist Oscar Herrera, who sang on two tracks.

Sources

Black Tape for a Blue Girl albums
Projekt Records albums
1999 albums